The Liberal Democratic Party (PLD), also called Balmacedists, was a liberal party in Chile. It was one of the main actors of the Chilean parliamentary system from 1891 to 1925.

Liberal Democratic Party or balmacedist 1893–1933

The Liberal Democratic Party or balmacedist was formed on 5 November 1893 during a convention in Talca. It assembled former supporters of president José Manuel Balmaceda. Its party platform was a return to a strong presidency like those previous to the 1891 Chilean Civil War.

The LDP would split into the LDP-Aliancist, supporters of Arturo Alessandri and the LDP-Unionist, the opposers to Alessandri. It lasted until 1930, when it merged into the United Liberal Party. After the downfall of president Carlos Ibáñez in 1931 it rearranged as an independent party before finally merging into the Liberal Party in 1933.

Results in parliamentary elections

Presidential candidates 
The following is a list of the presidential candidates supported by the Liberal Democratic Party (balmacedist). (Information gathered from the Archive of Chilean Elections). 
1896: Vicente Reyes (lost)
1901: Germán Riesco (won)
1906: Fernando Lazcano (lost)
1910: Ramón Barros Luco (won)
1915: Juan Luis Sanfuentes (won)
1920: Arturo Alessandri (won), Luis Barros Borgoño (lost)
1925: Emiliano Figueroa (won)
1927: none
1931: Arturo Alessandri (lost)
1932: Enrique Zañartu Prieto (lost)

See also
:Category:Liberal Democratic Party (Chile, 1893) politicians
Liberal Party (Chile, 1849–1966)
Liberal Democratic Party (Chile, 1875-1886)
Liberalism and radicalism in Chile

References

Liberal parties in Chile
Political parties established in 1893
Political parties disestablished in 1933
Defunct political parties in Chile
1893 establishments in Chile
1933 disestablishments in Chile